Ndai (local spelling Dai) is an island in the Solomon Islands; it is located in Malaita Province. It was formerly known as Gower Island (and sometimes Inattendue Island).

References

Islands of the Solomon Islands